Cedar Hill is an unincorporated community in northern Amanda Township, Fairfield County, Ohio, United States.  It lies at the intersection of Lancaster-Circleville (SR-188), Cedar Hill, and Westfall Roads.  Located in the west of the county, it lies west of Lancaster (the county seat of Fairfield County) and south of the village of Lithopolis.

References

Unincorporated communities in Fairfield County, Ohio